Hussain Qasim (born 21 September 1997) is a Saudi Arabian professional footballer who plays as a left back for Pro League side Al-Tai.

Career
Hussain Qassem started his career at the youth team of Al-Hilal. On 1 August 2018, Hussain Qassem left Al-Hilal and joined Pro League side Al-Ettifaq. On 14 September 2020, Hussain Qassem left Al-Ettifaq and joined Pro League side Al-Faisaly. On 28 July 2022, Qassem joined Al-Tai on a two-year deal.

Honours

Club
Al-Faisaly
King Cup: 2020–21

References

External links 
 

1997 births
Living people
Sportspeople from Riyadh
Saudi Arabian footballers
Saudi Arabia youth international footballers
Al Hilal SFC players
Ettifaq FC players
Al-Faisaly FC players
Al-Tai FC players
Saudi Professional League players
Association football fullbacks